is a railway station in the city of Nishio, Aichi Prefecture, Japan, operated by Meitetsu.

Lines

Station layout
The station has a single side platform serving one bidirectional track. The station has automated ticket machines, Manaca automated turnstiles and is unattended.

Adjacent stations

|-
!colspan=5|Nagoya Railroad

Station history
The station was closed in 1944 due to World War II, and reopened on October 1, 1952, at a new location to the west of the original station. It was relocated again in October 1974 and renamed to its present name on October 10, 1976. It has been unattended since 1952.

Passenger statistics
In fiscal 2017, the station was used by an average of 77 passengers daily (boarding passengers only).

Surrounding area
Aichi Kodomonokuni Amusement Park.

See also
 List of Railway Stations in Japan

References

External links

 Official web page

Railway stations in Japan opened in 1936
Railway stations in Aichi Prefecture
Stations of Nagoya Railroad
Nishio, Aichi